Pedro de Godinez (died 1611) was a Roman Catholic prelate who was appointed as Bishop of Nueva Caceres (1605–1611).

Biography
De Godinez was ordained a priest in the Order of Friars Minor. On 12 December 1605, he was appointed during the papacy of Pope Paul V as Bishop of Nueva Caceres. He died before he was consecrated in 1611.

References

External links and additional sources
 (for Chronology of Bishops) 
 (for Chronology of Bishops) 

17th-century Roman Catholic bishops in the Philippines
Bishops appointed by Pope Paul V
1611 deaths
Franciscan bishops